Hysteretic models are mathematical models capable of simulating the complex nonlinear behavior characterizing mechanical systems and materials used in different fields of engineering, such as aerospace, civil, and mechanical engineering. Some examples of mechanical systems and materials having hysteretic behavior are:
 materials, such as steel, reinforced concrete, wood;
 structural elements, such as steel, reinforced concrete, or wood joints;
 devices, such as seismic isolators and dampers.

Hysteretic models may have a generalized displacement  as input variable and a generalized force  as output variable, or vice versa. In particular, in rate-independent hysteretic models, the output variable does not depend on the rate of variation of the input one.

Rate-independent hysteretic models can be classified into four different categories depending on the type of equation that needs to be solved to compute the output variable:
 Algebraic models;
 Transcendental models;
 Differential models;
 Integral models.

Algebraic models
In algebraic models, the output variable is computed by solving algebraic equations.

Bilinear model

Model formulation

In the bilinear model formulated by Vaiana et al. (2018), the generalized force at time t, representing the output variable, is evaluated as a function of the generalized displacement as follows:
 

 
Furthermore, is an internal model parameter evaluated as:
 
whereas  is the internal variable:
 .

Hysteresis loop shapes
Figure 1.1 shows two different hysteresis loop shapes obtained by applying a sinusoidal generalized displacement having unit amplitude and frequency and simulated by adopting the Bilinear Model (BM) parameters listed in Table 1.1.

Matlab code 
%  =========================================================================================
%  June 2020
%  Bilinear Model Algorithm
%  Nicolò Vaiana, Research Fellow in Structural Mechanics and Dynamics, PhD 
%  Department of Structures for Engineering and Architecture 
%  University of Naples Federico II
%  via Claudio, 21 - 80124, Napoli
%  =========================================================================================

clc; clear all; close all;

%% APPLIED DISPLACEMENT TIME HISTORY

dt = 0.001;                                                                %time step
t  = 0:dt:1.50;                                                            %time interval
a0 = 1;                                                                    %applied displacement amplitude
fr = 1;                                                                    %applied displacement frequency
u  = a0*sin((2*pi*fr)*t(1:length(t)));                                     %applied displacement vector
v  = 2*pi*fr*a0*cos((2*pi*fr)*t(1:length(t)));                             %applied velocity vector
n  = length(u);                                                            %applied displacement vector length

%% 1. INITIAL SETTINGS
%1.1 Set the three model parameters
ka = 10.0;                                                                 %model parameter
kb = 1.0;                                                                  %model parameter
f0 = 0.5;                                                                  %model parameter
%1.2 Compute the internal model parameters 
u0 = f0/(ka-kb);                                                           %internal model parameter
%1.3 Initialize the generalized force vector
f  = zeros(1,n);

%% 2. CALCULATIONS AT EACH TIME STEP

for i = 2:n
%2.1 Update the history variable
uj = (ka*u(i-1)+sign(v(i))*f0-f(i-1))/(ka-kb);
%2.2 Evaluate the generalized force at time t
if (sign(v(i))*uj)-2*u0 < sign(v(i))*u(i) && sign(v(i))*u(i) < sign(v(i))*uj
    f(i) = ka*(u(i)-uj)+kb*uj+sign(v(i))*f0;
else
    f(i) = kb*u(i)+sign(v(i))*f0;
end
end

%% PLOT
figure
plot(u,f,'k','linewidth',4)
set(gca,'FontSize',28)
set(gca,'FontName','Times New Roman')
xlabel('generalized displacement'), ylabel('generalized force')
grid
zoom off

Asymmetric bilinear model

Model formulation
In the asymmetric bilinear model formulated by Vaiana et al. (2020), the generalized force at time t, representing the output variable, is evaluated as a function of the generalized displacement as follows:
 

 
Furthermore,  is an internal model parameter evaluated as:
 
whereas  is the internal variable:

Matlab code 
%  =========================================================================================
%  February 2021
%  Asymmetric Bilinear Model Algorithm
%  Nicolò Vaiana, Research Fellow in Structural Mechanics and Dynamics, PhD 
%  Department of Structures for Engineering and Architecture 
%  University of Naples Federico II
%  via Claudio, 21 - 80124, Napoli
%  =========================================================================================

clc; clear all; close all;

%% APPLIED DISPLACEMENT TIME HISTORY

dt = 0.001;                                                                %time step
t  = 0:dt:1.50;                                                            %time interval
a0 = 1;                                                                    %applied displacement amplitude
fr = 1;                                                                    %applied displacement frequency
u  = a0*sin((2*pi*fr)*t(1:length(t)));                                     %applied displacement vector
v  = 2*pi*fr*a0*cos((2*pi*fr)*t(1:length(t)));                             %applied velocity vector
n  = length(u);                                                            %applied displacement vector length

%% 1. INITIAL SETTINGS
%1.1 Set the six model parameters
kap = 5.0;                                                                 %model parameter
kbp = 0.5;                                                                 %model parameter
f0p = 0.75;                                                                %model parameter
kam = 15.0;                                                                %model parameter
kbm = 0.1;                                                                 %model parameter
f0m = 0.25;                                                                %model parameter
%1.2 Initialize the generalized force vector
f   = zeros(1,n);

%% 2. CALCULATIONS AT EACH TIME STEP

for i = 2:n
%2.1 Update the model parameters, the history variable, and the internal model parameter
if v(i)>0
    ka = kap; kb = kbp; f0 = f0p;
else
    ka = kam; kb = kbm; f0 = f0m;
end
uj = (ka*u(i-1)+sign(v(i))*f0-f(i-1))/(ka-kb);
if v(i)>0
    u0 = ((kbp-kbm)*uj+f0p+f0m)/(2*(kap-kbm));
else
    u0 = ((kbp-kbm)*uj+f0p+f0m)/(2*(kam-kbp));
end
%2.2 Evaluate the generalized force at time t
if (sign(v(i))*uj)-2*u0 < sign(v(i))*u(i) && sign(v(i))*u(i) < sign(v(i))*uj
    f(i) = ka*(u(i)-uj)+kb*uj+sign(v(i))*f0;
else
    f(i) = kb*u(i)+sign(v(i))*f0;
end
end

%% PLOT
figure
plot(u,f,'k','linewidth',4)
set(gca,'FontSize',28)
set(gca,'FontName','Times New Roman')
xlabel('generalized displacement'), ylabel('generalized force')
grid
zoom off

Animation 
The following gif shows the nonlinear response of a single-degree-of-freedom (SDOF) mechanical system, with unit mass and asymmetric rate-independent hysteretic behavior, subjected to an external random force. To simulate its response, the following ABM parameters have been used: .

Algebraic model by Vaiana et al. (2019)

Model formulation
In the algebraic model developed by Vaiana et al. (2019), the generalized force at time , representing the output variable, is evaluated as a function of the generalized displacement as follows:
 

 
 

 
whereas  is the internal variable:

Hysteresis loop shapes
Figure 1.2 shows four different hysteresis loop shapes obtained by applying a sinusoidal generalized displacement having unit amplitude and frequency and simulated by adopting the Algebraic Model (AM) parameters listed in Table 1.2.

Matlab code
%  =========================================================================================
%  September 2019
%  Algebraic Model Algorithm
%  Nicolò Vaiana, Post-Doctoral Researcher, PhD 
%  Department of Structures for Engineering and Architecture 
%  University of Naples Federico II
%  via Claudio, 21 - 80125, Napoli
%  =========================================================================================

clc; clear all; close all;

%% APPLIED DISPLACEMENT TIME HISTORY

dt = 0.001;                                                                %time step
t  = 0:dt:1.50;                                                            %time interval
a0 = 1;                                                                    %applied displacement amplitude
fr = 1;                                                                    %applied displacement frequency
u  = a0*sin((2*pi*fr)*t(1:length(t)));                                     %applied displacement vector
v  = 2*pi*fr*a0*cos((2*pi*fr)*t(1:length(t)));                             %applied velocity vector
n  = length(u);                                                            %applied displacement vector length

%% 1. INITIAL SETTINGS
%1.1 Set the five model parameters
ka    = 10.0;                                                              %model parameter
kb    = 1.0;                                                               %model parameter
alfa  = 10.0;                                                              %model parameter
beta1 = 0.0;                                                               %model parameter
beta2 = 0.0;                                                               %model parameter
%1.2 Compute the internal model parameters 
u0    = (1/2)*((((ka-kb)/10^-20)^(1/alfa))-1);                             %internal model parameter
f0    = ((ka-kb)/2)*((((1+2*u0)^(1-alfa))-1)/(1-alfa));                    %internal model parameter
%1.3 Initialize the generalized force vector
f     = zeros(1, n);

%% 2. CALCULATIONS AT EACH TIME STEP

for i = 2:n
%2.1 Update the history variable
uj = u(i-1)+sign(v(i))*(1+2*u0)-sign(v(i))*((((sign(v(i))*(1-alfa))/(ka-kb))*(f(i-1)-beta1*u(i-1)^3-beta2*u(i-1)^5-kb*u(i-1)-sign(v(i))*f0+(ka-kb)*(((1+2*u0)^(1-alfa))/(sign(v(i))*(1-alfa)))))^(1/(1-alfa)));
%2.2 Evaluate the generalized force at time t
if (sign(v(i))*uj)-2*u0 < sign(v(i))*u(i) || sign(v(i))*u(i) < sign(v(i))*uj
    f(i) = beta1*u(i)^3+beta2*u(i)^5+kb*u(i)+(ka-kb)*((((1+2*u0+sign(v(i))*(u(i)-uj))^(1-alfa))/(sign(v(i))*(1-alfa)))-(((1+2*u0)^(1-alfa))/(sign(v(i))*(1-alfa))))+sign(v(i))*f0;
else
    f(i) = beta1*u(i)^3+beta2*u(i)^5+kb*u(i)+sign(v(i))*f0;
end
end

%% PLOT
figure
plot(u, f, 'k', 'linewidth', 4)
set(gca, 'FontSize', 28)
set(gca, 'FontName', 'Times New Roman')
xlabel('generalized displacement'), ylabel('generalized force')
grid
zoom off

Transcendental models
In transcendental models, the output variable is computed by solving transcendental equations, namely equations involving trigonometric, inverse trigonometric, exponential, logarithmic, and/or hyperbolic functions.

Exponential models

Exponential model by Vaiana et al. (2018)

Model formulation
In the exponential model developed by Vaiana et al. (2018), the generalized force at time , representing the output variable, is evaluated as a function of the generalized displacement as follows:
 

 
 

 
whereas  is the internal variable:

Hysteresis loop shapes
Figure 2.1 shows four different hysteresis loop shapes obtained by applying a sinusoidal generalized displacement having unit amplitude and frequency and simulated by adopting the Exponential Model (EM) parameters listed in Table 2.1.

Matlab code
%  =========================================================================================
%  September 2019
%  Exponential Model Algorithm
%  Nicolò Vaiana, Post-Doctoral Researcher, PhD 
%  Department of Structures for Engineering and Architecture 
%  University of Naples Federico II
%  via Claudio, 21 - 80125, Napoli
%  =========================================================================================

clc; clear all; close all;

%% APPLIED DISPLACEMENT TIME HISTORY

dt = 0.001;                                                                %time step
t  = 0:dt:1.50;                                                            %time interval
a0 = 1;                                                                    %applied displacement amplitude
fr = 1;                                                                    %applied displacement frequency
u  = a0*sin((2*pi*fr)*t(1:length(t)));                                     %applied displacement vector
v  = 2*pi*fr*a0*cos((2*pi*fr)*t(1:length(t)));                             %applied velocity vector
n  = length(u);                                                            %applied displacement vector length

%% 1. INITIAL SETTINGS
%1.1 Set the four model parameters
ka    = 5.0;                                                               %model parameter
kb    = 0.5;                                                               %model parameter
alfa  = 5.0;                                                               %model parameter
beta  = 1.0;                                                               %model parameter
%1.2 Compute the internal model parameters 
u0    = -(1/(2*alfa))*log(10^-20/(ka-kb));                                 %internal model parameter
f0    = ((ka-kb)/(2*alfa))*(1-exp(-2*alfa*u0));                            %internal model parameter
%1.3 Initialize the generalized force vector
f     = zeros(1, n);

%% 2. CALCULATIONS AT EACH TIME STEP

for i = 2:n
%2.1 Update the history variable
uj = u(i-1)+2*u0*sign(v(i))+sign(v(i))*(1/alfa)*log(sign(v(i))*(alfa/(ka-kb))*(-2*beta*u(i-1)+exp(beta*u(i-1))-exp(-beta*u(i-1))+kb*u(i-1)+sign(v(i))*((ka-kb)/alfa)*exp(-2*alfa*u0)+sign(v(i))*f0-f(i-1)));
%2.2 Evaluate the generalized force at time t
if (sign(v(i))*uj)-2*u0 < sign(v(i))*u(i) || sign(v(i))*u(i) < sign(v(i))*uj
    f(i) = -2*beta*u(i)+exp(beta*u(i))-exp(-beta*u(i))+kb*u(i)-sign(v(i))*((ka-kb)/alfa)*(exp(-alfa*(sign(v(i))*(u(i)-uj)+2*u0))-exp(-2*alfa*u0))+sign(v(i))*f0;
else
    f(i) = -2*beta*u(i)+exp(beta*u(i))-exp(-beta*u(i))+kb*u(i)+sign(v(i))*f0;
end
end

%% PLOT
figure
plot(u ,f, 'k', 'linewidth', 4)
set(gca, 'FontSize', 28)
set(gca, 'FontName', 'Times New Roman')
xlabel('generalized displacement'), ylabel('generalized force')
grid
zoom off

References

Dynamical systems
Hysteresis
Materials science
Nonlinear systems